The women's football tournament at the 2020 Summer Olympics was held from 21 July to 6 August 2021. Originally, it was to be held from 22 July to 7 August 2020, but the Summer Olympics were postponed to the following year due to the COVID-19 pandemic. However, the official name of the games remains the 2020 Summer Olympics. It was the seventh edition of the women's Olympic football tournament. Together with the men's competition, the 2020 Summer Olympics football tournament was held at six stadiums in six cities in Japan. The final was hosted at the International Stadium in Yokohama. There were no player age restrictions for teams participating in the competition.

Germany, the winners of the previous tournament, failed to qualify for the tournament after being eliminated in the quarter-finals of the 2019 FIFA Women's World Cup.

Canada won their first gold medal by defeating Sweden 3–2 in the penalty shoot-out after both teams drew 1–1 after extra time in the final. The United States won bronze, defeating Australia 4–3 in the bronze medal game.

Schedule

Qualification

In addition to host nation Japan, eleven women's national teams qualified from six separate continental confederations. The Organising Committee for FIFA Competitions ratified the distribution of spots at their meeting on 14 September 2017.

For the first time, per the agreement between the four British football associations (England, Northern Ireland, Scotland, and Wales) for the women's team, Great Britain attempted to qualify for the Olympics through England's performance in the 2019 FIFA Women's World Cup (a procedure already successfully employed by Team GB in field hockey and rugby sevens). The team's only previous appearance was in the 2012 tournament in which they qualified automatically as hosts. Great Britain succeeded in qualifying as England were among the three best European teams. Scotland also qualified for the World Cup but under the agreement whereby the highest ranked home nation was nominated to compete for the purposes of Olympic qualification, their performance was not taken into account (Scottish, Welsh and Northern Irish players are eligible to be part of the Great Britain team at the Olympics).

Venues

The tournament was held in six venues across six cities:
Kashima Stadium, Kashima
Miyagi Stadium, Rifu
Saitama Stadium 2002, Saitama
Sapporo Dome, Sapporo
Tokyo Stadium, Tokyo
International Stadium Yokohama, Yokohama

The gold medal match was originally scheduled to be played at the National Stadium in Tokyo. Both finalists requested a later kick-off time due to concerns about excessive heat; as the National Stadium was already booked for athletics events in the evening, the game was moved to the International Stadium Yokohama in Yokohama. Due to the COVID-19 pandemic in Japan, most matches were played behind closed doors without any spectators. However, Miyagi Stadium allowed a limited audience to attend matches and Kashima Stadium permitted local schoolchildren as part of the school program but Olympic spectators were still not allowed.

Squads

The tournament was a full international tournament with no restrictions on age. Traditionally the roster rules required each team to submit a squad of 18 players, two of whom must be goalkeepers. Each team also named a list of four alternate players who could replace any player in the squad in case of injury during the tournament. In late June 2021, the International Olympic Committee and FIFA announced that all 22 players of each team would be available for selection before each match. Prior to each match, the teams chose from their total of 22 players, a roster of 18 players to be available for play in that match. The IOC also confirmed that a player must appear on at least one 18-player matchday roster to be considered an Olympian and to receive a medal. The rule change was made in regards to the challenges presented by the COVID-19 pandemic.

Match officials
In June 2020, FIFA approved the use of the video assistant referee (VAR) system for the tournament. The match officials were announced on 23 April 2021.

Draw
The draw for the tournament was held on 21 April 2021, 10:00 CEST (UTC+2), at the FIFA headquarters in Zürich, Switzerland. It was conducted by Sarai Bareman, FIFA chief women's football officer, while Samantha Johnson presented the ceremony. Lindsay Tarpley and Ryan Nelsen acted as the draw assistants.

The 12 teams were drawn into three groups of four teams. The hosts Japan were automatically seeded into Pot 1 and assigned to position E1 while the remaining teams were seeded into their respective pots based on the FIFA Women's World Rankings released on 16 April 2021 (shown in parentheses below). As Great Britain are not a FIFA member and therefore do not have a ranking, they were seeded based on the FIFA ranking of England who qualified on behalf of Great Britain. However, all Great Britain matches were officially recognized by FIFA. No group could contain more than one team from each confederation.

Group stage
The competing countries were divided into three groups of four teams, denoted as groups E, F and G to avoid confusion with the groups of the men's tournament (which use designations A to D). Teams in each group played one another in a round-robin basis, with the top two teams of each group and the two best third-placed teams advancing to the quarter-finals.

All times are local, JST (UTC+9).

Tiebreakers
The ranking of teams in the group stage was determined as follows:

 Points obtained in all group matches (three points for a win, one for a draw, none for a defeat);
 Goal difference in all group matches;
 Number of goals scored in all group matches;
 Points obtained in the matches played between the teams in question;
 Goal difference in the matches played between the teams in question;
 Number of goals scored in the matches played between the teams in question;
 Fair play points in all group matches (only one deduction could be applied to a player in a single match): 
 Drawing of lots.

Group E

Group F

Group G

Ranking of third-placed teams

Knockout stage

In the knockout stage, if a match was level at the end of normal playing time, extra time was played (two periods of 15 minutes each) and followed, if necessary, by a penalty shoot-out to determine the winner.

Bracket

Quarter-finals

Semi-finals

Bronze medal match

Gold medal match

Statistics

Goalscorers

Discipline
A player was automatically suspended for the next match for the following offences:
 Receiving a red card (red card suspensions could be extended for serious offences)
 Receiving two yellow cards in two matches; yellow cards expired after the completion of the quarter-finals (yellow card suspensions were not carried forward to any other future international matches)

The following offences warranted a suspension during the tournament:

Tournament ranking

References

External links
Women's Olympic Football Tournament Tokyo 2020, FIFA.com

 
Women
2020
Summer Olympics
2020 Olympics
Women's events at the 2020 Summer Olympics